Erica Lord is an Alaska Native artist, based in Santa Fe, New Mexico, who identifies herself as a mixed-race "cultural limbo."

Life 
Born to a Finnish-American mother and Iñupiaq/Athabascan father, Erica Lord grew up traveling between her father's village in Nenana, Alaska and her mother's home community in Michigan. Nenana, located in Interior Alaska, has a large Native population, according to the 2010 census its populated by 378 people. Her mother lived in a mostly white town in Michigan's Upper Peninsula. Lord's father was an activist in the Indian movement. Her personal experience perpetually moving between various geographic places inspires her work's interest in themes of displacement, cultural identity and cultural limbo.

She received a B.A. in liberal arts and studio arts from Carleton College in 2001 and completed her M.F.A. in sculpture and photography at The School of the Art Institute of Chicago in 2006.

Identity 
Lord describes herself as having become an emigrant through her six families and defines her history as the Native diaspora. That same diaspora is what motivates her art. It's for her to explore a new way of demonstrating true cultural identity. She hopes that her art helps her audience redefine their selves, communities, and beliefs.

Career 
Erica Lord has exhibited her work in solo exhibitions at the DeVos Museum of Art (Marquette, MI) and the Alaska Native Arts Foundation Gallery (Anchorage, AK), as well as in group exhibitions such as the Havana Biennial and the IAIA Museum of Contemporary Native American Art.

Erica Lord was a participant in the Smithsonian Archives of American Art Pandemic Oral History Project in September 2020. The oral history series recorded responses to the global pandemic across the American art world. Conducted virtually, the Pandemic Oral History Project featured eighty-five short-form interviews with a diverse group of artists, teachers, curators, and administrators, including Erica Lord.

Notable exhibitions 
 2023, Sharing Honors and Burdens: Renwick Invitational 2023", Renwick GallerySmithsonian Institution. May 26, 2023 - March 31, 2024
 2020, Maajiigin wa’aw akiing miinawaa (Begin This World Again): Gina Adams, Erica Lord,  Merritt Johnson, at Accola Griefen Fine Art, New York, NY
2018, The New Red Order: The Savage Philosophy of Endless Acknowledgement, Whitney Museum of American Art, New York, NY
2007-2017, Our people, Our land, Our images: International Indigenous Photographers, on tour through ExhibitsUSA, a national program of Mid-America Arts Alliance.
2010, Dry Ice, Museum of Contemporary Native American Art, Santa Fe, NM
 2009, BadLand, Institute of American Indian Arts Museum, Santa Fe, NM: An installation of prayer bundles made from the red cloth of the United States' Star Spangled Banner.
 2007, Off the Map: Landscape and the Native Imagination, Smithsonian Institution National Museum of the American Indian, New York, NY

 Selected works 

 Native American Land Reclamation Project (2000) 
One of Lord's earliest projects, in 2000, focuses on her Native American roots. In her installation Native American Land Reclamation Project, she employs mixed media objects to bring awareness to the repeated cycle of broken U.S. treaties, specifically with Native Americans from 1778 to 1886. Displayed at the Institute of American Indian Arts, the installation occupied a 16" x 16" room with mirrors plastered to the walls, ceiling, floor. Hanging from the ceiling are dozens of cut-up red stripes (the blood) from the United States' flag. Lord then wrapped the cloth and filled it with dirt from various villages, reservations, and tribal lands from all over the U.S. to enact Pawnee's traditional flag-bundles; each flag-bundle signifies one prayer tie. The Pawnee people valued ceremony and medicine bundles to look over their crops, health, and religious practices. Lord suspended the prayer ties from the ceiling with sinew, which are animal fibrous tissues Native Americans used for everyday tasks such as sewing and tools. To show the repetition of history, Lord utilized the mirrors to multiply the prayer ties. In an interview, Lord explains, "I started thinking about what in my culture has been repeated over and over. [...] I wanted to create a piece that both acknowledged our history– and stressing both oppressor & survivor, Native & non-Native, it's a shared history".

 Un/Defined Self-Portrait Series (2005), C-prints of variable dimension 

 Untitled (Tattooed Arms) (2007), Digital Photographs 
Erica Lord photographs two tattoos: one on the inner side of her left forearm titled “Enrollment number” and one on her right forearm titled “Blood Quantum”. These two tattoos criticize the Native American image created by modern society. Lord's tattoo titled “Blood Quantum”, after the blood quantum laws, is a visual criticism on the United States government control on all Native American heritage. The tattoo “Enrollment Number” is the number given to Erica Lord, and all Native Americans, by the Bureau of Indian Affairs. Placing this number on her arm, Erica Lord draws direct comparison to Holocaust survivors and their experiences to the United States expansion and relocation of Native Americans.

 The Tanning Project: I Tan To Look More Native (2006),  Digital Inkjet, variable dimensions 
Common Native Art typically showcases Indian land and where they come from. However, this specific image has little to do with land because the photo has a black backdrop and the shot is from her waist up, focusing solely on her body. She boldly refers to this tanning ritual as white beautification: tanning or browning of the skin. Using such words is a very straight forward way to a political call to action. The words I Tan to Look More Native are scripted onto her back with sunscreen to show the contrast effect after tanning. The inscription is to challenge Native identity through the contrast being used, which to viewers start to become unrecognizable. It challenges what an "Indian" really looks like and what people thought they looked like. She uses her own body to show her struggles through becoming an emigrant. She is photographed nude with her back facing the camera in an erotic pin-up pose. She poses this way to give a duplicitous meaning to the word pose to expose those who have unrealistic expectations of what a Native person is supposed to look like.

 Artifact Piece, Revisited, (2009), performance and mixed media installation 
On April 3, 2008, Erica Lord arrived at the George Gustav Heye Center, the National Museum of the American Indian, at the Smithsonian Museum in New York, for a performance/installation titled Artifact Piece, Revisited. This piece was a reenactment of American artist James Luna's Artifact Piece,  first performed at the San Diego Museum of Man in 1987. When Lord entered the gallery, she lay down in a case, closed her eyes, and allowed museum visitors to examine her over the next few hours. Captions placed throughout the display identified parts of her, such as her painted toenails. There were two glass cases on either side of the box where Lord laid, that contained clothing and her personal possessions. One side contained Alaskan Native dress, and the other contained modern clothing. This first performance of Artifact Piece, Revisited'' was followed by lectures and a discussion with Lord herself. The artist returned to the museum to perform the piece again twice over the next two days. Using her body as a conversation piece, Lord critiqued the displaying of Native people in museum exhibits and the display of women's bodies.

References

External links
 
 Museum of Contemporary Native American Art
 2007 Interview with Erica Lord

Alaskan Athabaskan people
American women artists
Artists from Alaska
Artists from Michigan
Inupiat people
Living people
People from Nenana, Alaska
Year of birth missing (living people)
Interdisciplinary artists
Carleton College alumni
21st-century American women
21st-century Native American women
21st-century Native Americans